In mathematics, a volume element provides a means for integrating a function with respect to volume in various coordinate systems such as spherical coordinates and cylindrical coordinates.  Thus a volume element is an expression of the form

For example, in spherical coordinates , and so .

The notion of a volume element is not limited to three dimensions: in two dimensions it is often known as the area element, and in this setting it is useful for doing surface integrals.  Under changes of coordinates, the volume element changes by the absolute value of the Jacobian determinant of the coordinate transformation (by the change of variables formula).  This fact allows volume elements to be defined as a kind of measure on a manifold.  On an orientable differentiable manifold, a volume element typically arises from a volume form: a top degree differential form.  On a non-orientable manifold, the volume element is typically the absolute value of a (locally defined) volume form: it defines a 1-density.

Volume element in Euclidean space
In Euclidean space, the volume element is given by the product of the differentials of the Cartesian coordinates

For example, in spherical coordinates (mathematical convention) 

the Jacobian determinant is

so that

This can be seen as a special case of the fact that differential forms transform through a pullback  as

Volume element of a linear subspace 
Consider the linear subspace of the n-dimensional Euclidean space Rn that is spanned by a collection of linearly independent vectors

Any point p in the subspace can be given coordinates  such that

At a point p, if we form a small parallelepiped with sides , then the volume of that parallelepiped is the square root of the determinant of the Grammian matrix

This therefore defines the volume form in the linear subspace.

Volume element of manifolds

On an oriented Riemannian manifold of dimension n, the volume element is a volume form equal to the Hodge dual of the unit constant function, :

Equivalently, the volume element is precisely the Levi-Civita tensor . In coordinates,

where  is the determinant of the metric tensor g written in the coordinate system.

Area element of a surface 
A simple example of a volume element can be explored by considering a two-dimensional surface embedded in n-dimensional Euclidean space.  Such a volume element is sometimes called an area element.  Consider a subset  and a mapping function

In two dimensions, volume is just area, and a volume element gives a way to determine the area of parts of the surface. Thus a volume element is an expression of the form

that allows one to compute the area of a set B lying on the surface by computing the integral

Here we will find the volume element on the surface that defines area in the usual sense.  The Jacobian matrix of the mapping is

with index i running from 1 to n, and j running from 1 to 2. The Euclidean metric in the n-dimensional space induces a metric  on the set U, with matrix elements

The determinant of the metric is given by

For a regular surface, this determinant is non-vanishing; equivalently, the Jacobian matrix has rank 2.

Now consider a change of coordinates on U, given by a diffeomorphism

The Jacobian matrix of this transformation is given by

In the new coordinates, we have

and so the metric transforms as

where  is the pullback metric in the v coordinate system.  The determinant is

Given the above construction, it should now be straightforward to understand how the volume element is invariant under an orientation-preserving change of coordinates. 

In two dimensions, the volume is just the area. The area of a subset  is given by the integral

Thus, in either coordinate system, the volume element takes the same expression: the expression of the volume element is invariant under a change of coordinates.

Note that there was nothing particular to two dimensions in the above presentation; the above trivially generalizes to arbitrary dimensions.

Example: Sphere
For example, consider the sphere with radius r centered at the origin in R3.  This can be parametrized using spherical coordinates with the map

Then

and the area element is

See also
 
 
 Surface integral
 Volume integral

References
 

Measure theory
Integral calculus
Multivariable calculus